Victor S. Cianca Sr. (January 5, 1918 – January 24, 2010) was a traffic police officer from Pittsburgh, Pennsylvania, who spent his entire career with the Pittsburgh Police Bureau before he retired on January 4, 1983.  His flamboyant style of directing traffic led to appearances on the television program Candid Camera in 1964, and Allen Funt was so impressed he invited Cianca to direct traffic in New York City's Times Square.  He also appeared on Charles Kuralt's CBS News documentaries, The Tonight Show Starring Johnny Carson and Real People.  He also guest conducted the Pittsburgh Symphony Orchestra in 1981.  He later appeared in Budweiser commercials and was featured in the movie Flashdance, playing himself.

Upon his retirement in 1982, The Pittsburgh Press said that "A downtown traffic jam without Vic Cianca is a traffic jam with no redeeming qualities."

Following his death, the Pittsburgh Post-Gazette described him as a "Pittsburgh icon" with "affectionate yinzer spirit" on par with Fred Rogers and Myron Cope.

References

External links
Cianca with VP Nixon and Lodge

2010 deaths
1918 births
United States Navy personnel of World War II
American people of Italian descent
American police officers
People from Pittsburgh